Hello is a 2008 Indian Hindi thriller film directed by Atul Agnihotri, starring Sharman Joshi, Sohail Khan, Gul Panag, Isha Koppikar, Amrita Arora, and Sharat Saxena in the lead roles. The film is based on Chetan Bhagat's novel, One Night @ the Call Center. It also had cameo roles by Salman Khan and Katrina Kaif. It was released on 10 October 2008. Hello was declared a flop.

Plot
Salman Khan is a Bollywood actor, who is on a live tour near Delhi, where his private jet crashes. Luckily, he survives and in a lounge, he meets a girl. She tells him a story, about six friends and their boss who all work together at a Mumbai-based call centre. They are instructed never to reveal their location and speak with an American accent by a Boston-based company. There is Shyam (Sam), Priyanka, Varun, Esha, Radhika and Military Uncle. Their boss, Subhash Bakshi, attempts to further his career by plagiarising software, agreeing to lay off 40% of the Indian workforce, and re-locate to Boston. Although these six friends work together, they still go through some struggles ;Shyam tries his best to reconcile with Priyanka after their breakup, Esha gets annoyed by Varun when she thinks he likes her, Radhika is heartbroken when her husband Anuj cheats on her with his girlfriend, and Military Uncle wants a visa to see his son and grandson. Bakshi turns their names into American names such as turning Shyam into Agent Sam, Varun to Agent Victor, Esha to Elizabeth, Priyanka to Pearl, and Radhika to Rebecca.

One night, Shyam and his friends are forced to work in the nighttime shift until 4:00 in the morning. At work, Shyam realizes that Priyanka is going through a tough time with her arranged marriage with Ganesh, a wealthy Indian-American who stays in the United States, Shyam taps the phones phone line thanks to Varun helping him so that he can overhear their conversations. When Bakshi calls all of them to his office for a meeting, he talks with his American boss and the six friends overhear his plan about him going to Boston and steals Shyam and Varun's website manual along with him. Esha gets upset telling Shyam that Varun used her for nothing so Shyam tries talking to Varun until he loses his temper and starts breaking everything. At a party, they all get drunk and decide to head back home since it is late. The six are on their way home, until they approach an accident, and are stuck on top of a cliff in their car, and if anybody tries to move, the car may lose its balance and fall off the cliff. They all remain calm, and Shyam tries to call someone, he finds his phone battery has run out, therefore, in a rage he breaks his phone and throws it on the floor of the car. Later on, still trapped in the car, the broken phone receives a phone call; six surprised friends answer it, only to find the caller is God. God tells the six, they should keep calm, and just believe in themselves and all will be well. They do as they are told, and find that the fire brigade has arrived to save them. They all are saved. Bakshi is fired by his American boss and replaced by Shyam because he always had potential. Years later, Shyam and Varun open their own website academy, Shyam proposes to Priyanka and marries her, Military Uncle pays for a visa and goes to America, Radhika lives a carefree life after divorcing Anuj, Esha quits her fashion modeling career and works as an NGO Labourer, and Priyanka studies to becomes a school teacher. After the story, Khan asks the woman who she is, and she replies "if you believe in yourself, you will know the answer". She walks out of the lounge, and as Khan follows her, he seems to witness she has suddenly disappeared. He believes in himself, his jet gets fixed, and he flies back home.

Cast
 Sharman Joshi as Shyam Mehra (Sam)
 Sohail Khan as Varun Anand (Vroom/Victor)
 Arbaaz Khan as Anuj Jha
 Gul Panag as Priyanka Saxena (Pearl)
 Isha Koppikar as Esha Malhotra (Elizabeth)
 Amrita Arora as Radhika Jha (Rebecca)
 Sharat Saxena as Military uncle- Col. Arvind Tripathi
 Anusha Dandekar as Shefali Khandelwal
 Dalip Tahil as Subhash Bakshi
 Suresh Menon as System's guy- Lokesh Chandaramani (Loki)
 Salman Khan in a special appearance as himself
 Katrina Kaif in a special appearance as Mysterious Storyteller-Angel of God
 Rishi Nijhawan as Ganesh Acharya

Soundtrack
The album was released on 2008.

Reception
Hello had a fairly strong opening in the first week grossing approximately  60 million in the first three days itself (overseas notwithstanding). The film wasn't even a moderate success at the box office. Although it received mixed to negative reviews from critics, many citing the poorly sketched out characters as its biggest drawback, some praised its original concept.

References

External links
 

2008 films
2000s Hindi-language films
Films based on Indian novels
Sony Pictures films
Columbia Pictures films
Sony Pictures Networks India films